Rhorus is a genus of parasitoid wasps belonging to the family Ichneumonidae.

The species of this genus are found in Europe and Northern America.

Species:
 Rhorus abnormiceps (Roman, 1909) 
 Rhorus alpinator Aubert, 1965

References

Ichneumonidae
Ichneumonidae genera